Jaemyn Mikal Brakefield (born December 19, 2000) is an American college basketball player for the Ole Miss Rebels of the Southeastern Conference (SEC). He previously played for the Duke Blue Devils.

High school career 
Brakefield played at Huntington Prep School in Huntington, West Virginia for four years.

Recruiting
On October 4, 2019, Brakefield committed to play at Duke University.

Brakefield was rated as a consensus four-star recruit and ranked No. 31 overall recruit and No. 4 overall power forward in the 2020 high school class.

College career
Brakefield played for the Duke Blue Devils during the 2020–21 season. He averaged a disappointing 3.5 points, and 2.5 rebounds per game while shooting 40.8 percent from the floor. After the season he announced his decision to enter the transfer portal. On April 21, 2021, Brakefield decided to transfer to Ole Miss. He averaged 7.7 points, and 4.2 rebounds per game as a sophomore.

Career statistics

College

|-
| style="text-align:left;"| 2020–21
| style="text-align:left;"| Duke
| 22 || 2 || 12.5 || .408 || .314 || .417 || 2.5 || .5 || .4 || .4 || 3.5
|-
| style="text-align:left;"| 2021–22
| style="text-align:left;"| Ole Miss
| 32 || 25 || 25.3 || .471 || .373 || .686 || 4.2 || .8 || .7 || .2 || 7.7
|-
| style="text-align:left;"| 2022–23
| style="text-align:left;"| Ole Miss
| 2 || 2 || 18.0 || 1.000 || 1.000 || .667 || 4.0 || .5 || .0 || .0 || 10.0

Personal life
Brakefield is the son of Pamela Root and James Brakefield. He has four brothers – Jake Root, Andrew Knaack, Jamal Brakefield and Daimen Brakefield – and two sisters – Kristen Nickole and Jennifer Fleming.

References

External links
Ole Miss Rebels bio
Duke Blue Devils bio

2000 births
Living people
American men's basketball players
Basketball players from Wisconsin
Duke Blue Devils men's basketball players
Ole Miss Rebels men's basketball players
People from Menasha, Wisconsin
Power forwards (basketball)